David Barden is a Gaelic footballer from County Longford, Ireland. He was a member of the Longford county team between 2002 and 2013.  He won two O'Byrne Shield medals in 2006 and 2007. In 2011, he helped Longford overcome Roscommon in the National Football League Div 4 final at Croke Park. In 2012, Longford were back at Croke Park, this time for the Div 3 final and again won beating Wexford.

He played his club football with Clonguish with whom he won 3 Longford Senior Football Championships in 2003, 2004, and 2009. He also plays hurling with the club and won Longford Senior Hurling Championships in 2003, 2005, and 2006.

He is the nephew of 1960s Longford footballer Brendan Barden.

Honours
 3 Longford Senior Football Championships (2003, 2004, 2009)
 3 Longford Senior Hurling Championships (2003, 2005, 2006)
 2 O'Bryne Cup Shields (2006, 2007)
 1 National Football League Division 4 (2011)
 1 National Football League Division 3 (2012)

References

Year of birth missing (living people)
Living people
Clonguish Gaelic footballers
Clonguish hurlers
Dual players
Longford inter-county Gaelic footballers